The Open Water Swimming events at the 8th FINA World Aquatics Championships were swum in the ocean off Perth, Western Australia on January 6 and 11, 1998. The discipline featured 4 events: a 5-kilometer race, or "5K", for males and females, and a 25-kilometer race (25K) for males and females. It was the first time the 5K was raced a World Championships. The races featured 80 swimmers from 26 nations.

Results

Men

Women

Team

Medal standings

References

 FINA 
 USA Swimming  

 
O
1998 in swimming
Open water swimming at the World Aquatics Championships